Djurgården competed in the 2006 season in the Allsvenskan, Svenska Cupen and UEFA Champions League

Squad information

Squad

Player statistics
Appearances for competitive matches only.

|}

Goals

Total

Allsvenskan

Svenska Cupen

Champions League

Competitions

Overall

Allsvenskan

League table

Results summary

Matches

 Hammarby-Djurgården ended in the beginning of second half because fan riots from the Hammarby supporters. The result was 3-0 and it became also the result of the game. Hammarby also lost 6 points because of this.

Svenska Cupen

Champions League

2nd qualifying round

Ružomberok won 3–2 on aggregate.

Royal League

Group stage

Quarter-finals

Semifinals

Friendlies

Djurgårdens IF Fotboll seasons
Djurgarden